Nittany may refer to:

Locations
 Mount Nittany, a mountain in Centre County, Pennsylvania
 Nittany Valley, a valley between Mount Nittany and Bald Eagle Mountain, in Pennsylvania
 Nittany Arch, a geographic feature in the Appalachian Mountains
 Nittany, Pennsylvania, a town in Centre County, Pennsylvania

Sports
 Penn State Nittany Lions, the sports teams for Pennsylvania State University
 Nittany Lion, the mascot for said teams
 The Nittany Lion (song), the school's fight song
 Nittany Nation, the student cheering section
 Nittany Lion Shrine, a statue at Pennsylvania State University

Transportation
 Nittany Valley Railroad, a former shortline railroad
 Nittany and Bald Eagle Railroad, a current shortline railroad

Other
 Nittany Furnace, a former iron furnace in Spring Township, Pennsylvania
 Nittany Mall, a shopping center in State College, Pennsylvania
 Nittany Apple, a hybrid cultivar of Golden Delicious and York Imperial apples